John Smith (August 12, 1789 – November 26, 1858) was an American lawyer, businessman, and politician from Vermont. He served as a U.S. Representative for one term, prior to which he served as Speaker of the Vermont House of Representatives.

Biography
Smith was born in Barre, Massachusetts to Deacon Samuel Smith and Patience Gregory Smith. His family moved to St. Albans in 1800, and he attended the common schools.  Smith later studied law, first with his brother in law Roswell Hutchins, and later with Benjamin Swift. He was admitted to the bar in 1810 and began the practice of law in St. Albans as Swift's partner.

He was State's Attorney for Franklin County from 1826 until 1832. Smith was a member of the Vermont House of Representatives from 1827 until 1837, and served as Speaker from 1831 until 1833.

He was elected as a Democrat to the Twenty-sixth Congress, serving from March 4, 1839 until March 3, 1841. He was an unsuccessful candidate for reelection in 1840 to the Twenty-seventh Congress.

While in Congress, Smith delivered the speech, ""The Defense of the Independent Treasury Idea", which gained national attention and was considered one of the best speeches on this subject. Smith received an honorary Master of Arts degree from the University of Vermont.

After leaving Congress, Smith became involved in railroad enterprises and helped establish the Vermont and Canada Railroad.

Family
John Smith married Maria Waitstill Curtis in 1814.  Their children included Harriet Maria, J. Gregory, Edward Curtis,  Worthington Curtis, Julia Pierpont, Francis Curtis, and Louisa Ten Broeck.

He was the grandfather of Edward Curtis Smith.  In addition, his family was related by marriage to those of Lawrence Brainerd, Amaziah Bailey James and F. Stewart Stranahan.

Smith was also the great-great-grandfather of William Scranton, who served as Governor of and a Congressman from Pennsylvania.  The genealogical line runs from John Smith (great-great-grandfather) to Worthington C. Smith (great-grandfather) to Katherine Maria Smith Scranton (grandmother) to Worthington Scranton (father) to William Scranton.

Death
Smith died on November 26, 1858 in St. Albans, Vermont. He in interred at Greenwood Cemetery in St. Albans.

References

Further reading
 "Genealogical and Family History of the State of Vermont: A Record of the Achievements of Her People in the Making of a Commonwealth and the Founding of a Nation, Volume 2" by Hiram Carleton, published by Lewis Publishing Company, 1903.

External links
 

Biographical Directory of the United States Congress

Govtrack.us
The Political Graveyard
History 50 States

1789 births
1858 deaths
Democratic Party members of the Vermont House of Representatives
Speakers of the Vermont House of Representatives
Vermont lawyers
People from Barre, Massachusetts
People from St. Albans, Vermont
Burials in Vermont
Democratic Party members of the United States House of Representatives from Vermont
19th-century American politicians
American lawyers admitted to the practice of law by reading law
State's attorneys in Vermont
19th-century American lawyers